The Lion Man is a 1936 American film very loosely based on The Lad and the Lion by Edgar Rice Burroughs, and the 1917 silent movie of the same title.  It was directed by John P. McCarthy and produced by Arthur Alexander and Max Alexander. The film stars Jon Hall then appearing under his real name Charles Locher and Kathleen Burke who had recently co-starred in The Lives of a Bengal Lancer.  The Lion Man was re-released as a "Tarzan Vs the Lion Man" double feature in the late 1940s.

According to Filmink "Hall doesn’t appear until half-way through the story but he’s not bad and handles the fight scenes well. However, The Lion Man was not widely seen – it was very cheap, and there were legal issues with the Burroughs estate."

Cast
Jon Hall 	... Ed Lion (as Charles Locher)
Kathleen Burke 	... 	Eulilah
Ted Adams 	... Sheikh Youssef Ab-Dur
Jimmy Aubrey 	... 	Simmonds 
Richard Carlyle 	... 	Hassan El Dinh

Notes

External links 
 
 

1936 films
1936 adventure films
1930s independent films
American black-and-white films
American adventure films
American independent films
Films based on works by Edgar Rice Burroughs
Films directed by John P. McCarthy
1930s English-language films
1930s American films
English-language adventure films